The Looney Tunes Show is an American animated sitcom produced by Warner Bros. Animation that ran from May 3, 2011, through November 2, 2013, on Cartoon Network. The series consists of two seasons, each containing 26 episodes, and features characters from the Looney Tunes and Merrie Melodies theatrical cartoon shorts updated for the 21st century.

Initially, the series received mixed reviews from critics, who praised the visual style, humor, portrayal of the characters, and voice acting, but criticized its direction, its divergences from its source material, its lack of slapstick, and its changes to the characters' designs and personalities.

Premise
The series revolves around roommates Bugs Bunny and Daffy Duck living in a suburb with "colorful neighbors" including Lola Bunny, Tina Russo, Porky Pig, Foghorn Leghorn, Elmer Fudd, Sylvester, Tweety, Granny, Gossamer, Yosemite Sam, Taz, Speedy Gonzales, Marvin the Martian, Pete Puma and more. The series contained less slapstick and fewer visual gags, but instead was more adult-oriented and dialogue-driven with love triangles, employment and rooming.

Wraparound segments
The show also features two other segments which wrap around the main plot. These consist of:
 Merrie Melodies – Approximately two-to-four-minute music videos showcasing classic characters singing brand new original songs. They appear midway through most of the episodes in Season 1 and at the end of most episodes in Season 2 in place of the Road Runner and Wile E. Coyote shorts.
 Wile E. Coyote and the Road Runner – A series of computer-animated shorts depicting Wile E. Coyote's attempts to catch the Road Runner. These segments came at the end of nearly every first-season episode. They were dropped after season one with the Merrie Melodies songs moving to the ending of most season 2 episodes.

Episodes

Characters

Main
 Bugs Bunny (voiced by Jeff Bergman) – is a grey and white male bunny who lives a life of upper-middle-class suburban leisure, based on income from a popular Carrot Peeler that Bugs invented. Bugs lives in a well-appointed house, drives a compact car, and provides room and board for his best friend, Daffy Duck. Bugs spends his time watching sports on TV, hanging out with his friends and neighbors, and dating Lola Bunny. Bugs generally plays the straight man to Daffy and Lola's various bouts of insanity, although Bugs is not without his own quirks. Bugs has exhibited somewhat compulsive/addictive tendencies, like having a high caffeine intake with coffee, becoming addicted to an energy drink that had dangerous chemicals in it, nearly leveling his own house in an increasingly deranged attempt to put up a shelf, playing "Gribbler's Quest", and getting hooked on foods that contain butter. Despite being intelligent, Bugs has shown some level of tomfoolery, such as when he found jail "a smart aleck's paradise" and mistook the Tasmanian Devil for a dog.
 Daffy Duck (voiced by Jeff Bergman) – is a male black duck who is the roommate and best friend of Bugs Bunny. Unlike Bugs, Daffy is an incompetent, unproductive leech and an ungrateful user that has no way of earning money and relies on Bugs for food and shelter. He also has a high maintenance streak as he demands far more from his friends than he deserves and takes high advantage of gullible Porky, his other "best friend". Like in the classic shorts, Daffy constantly hatches get-rich-quick schemes that end up failing repeatedly. While Daffy's greed and jealousy of Bugs remains, it appears less antagonistic in the show. In the first episode, Bugs openly admits that Daffy is his best friend, despite his faults. Daffy has worked, and been fired from, numerous jobs due to negligence and/or incompetence. Despite this, however, Daffy has shown to be a very skilled hairdresser and successfully graduated beauty school. Daffy's three possessions that Daffy is proud of are his blue recliner, his white collar which Daffy always wears, and his Papier-mâché parade float, constructed on top of a pickup truck, which is his main means of transport. Daffy resembles Chuck Jones' version of Daffy in which this is the penultimate time of this version's use as later versions more closely resembles Tex Avery's original version of the character with the screwball personality.
 Porky Pig (voiced by Bob Bergen) – is a male pig who is one of Bugs Bunny's friends and Daffy Duck's best friend. Despite being bright and bookish, Porky has an innocent, naïve quality that Daffy frequently uses to his advantage, tricking Porky into parting with large sums of money or accompanying him in bizarre schemes. Porky originally worked a boring office job as an accountant, but got fired following Bugs' example. Porky started his own catering company afterwards. In "Dear John", Porky was shown to have served on the city council. Towards the end of the series, Porky starts a relationship with Petunia in the end of the Season 2 episode "Here Comes The Pig". In "Best Friends Redux", Daffy meets Porky's young self and ensures that Porky becomes good friends with Bugs & Rodney in their cabin, finally showing Porky an act of kindness.
 Speedy Gonzales (voiced by Fred Armisen) – is an extremely fast male mouse who lives with Bugs and Daffy as their "mouse in the wall" and runs a pizza parlor called Pizzarriba. Speedy is one of the brighter, more level-headed characters as he is not afraid to speak his mind (even standing up to Bugs at times, despite living rent free in a mouse hole in Bugs house) and has occasionally shown to act as Daffy's conscience. The episode "Sunday Night Slice" showed that Bugs bought his favorite restaurant Girardi's to prevent it from being closed and hired Speedy to help him. When Bugs spoke to Speedy about the fact that he doesn't want to own a restaurant anymore, Bugs himself hands ownership of it to Speedy, renaming it "Pizzarriba" as a gift to Speedy.
 Yosemite Sam (voiced by Maurice LaMarche) – is a male cowboy who is one of Bugs and Daffy's neighbors. Sam is a liar, a thief and a cheat, amongst other things. Coming from a lower-class background, Sam tends to steal Bugs' possessions, causing Bugs and Daffy to resent him. His full name was revealed as Samuel Rosenbaum.
 Lola Bunny (voiced by Kristen Wiig) – is a brown female bunny who is Bugs' scatter-brained, bubbly and obsessive girlfriend, who has a habit of speaking rapidly, whether anyone else is listening or not. When they first meet, Bugs falls in love with her, but after learning how crazy and ditsy Lola is, Bugs loses interest and often tries to escape her company. Lola develops a huge obsession with Bugs Bunny that Daffy initially finds creepy, however in later episodes Daffy and Lola become friends as neither one is very bright. Lola is never put off by Bugs' responses to behavior, that include taking photos of him in the shower, sneaking up on him late at night and often stalking him. Later in the series however, Bugs eventually falls in love with Lola again which started when they went to Paris in the episode "Eligible Bachelors" and Bugs manages to stop her talking for a while. Her parents are members of a country club and her father likes Bugs so much that he considers him to be "The son I never had." Lola was redesigned in both appearance and personality to match the series.
 Tina Russo (voiced by Jennifer Esposito in season one, Annie Mumolo in season two) – is a new character original to the show who is a female yellow duck and Daffy's girlfriend. Tina works at a copy store called "Copy Place". Tina is another straight character of the show, with a no-nonsense personality. Tina first starts dating Daffy because "Tina likes a project"; Tina tolerates his selfish and arrogant behavior as Tina has a keen astuteness which allows her to read between the lines when they first meet; Tina works out that Daffy is actually insecure and jealous, and that his vain attitude is really a front. Daffy is amazed Tina works this out so quickly and later reveals Tina, through email, that Daffy can't believe someone "so kind, beautiful, generous, and intelligent" would ever want to be with someone like him. After reading this, Tina is touched, and tells Daffy that she loves him. Tina is based on Melissa Duck from the original theatrical shorts. The character was originally called Marisol Mallard in the Laff Riot pilot.

Recurring
 Tasmanian Devil/Taz/Poochie (voiced by Jim Cummings) – is a male Tasmanian devil who is Bugs’ pet. In this show, the Tasmanian Devil is portrayed as walking on four legs like a real Tasmanian devil and his eyes are bloodshot red (later turned back to yellow after Bugs uses a taming trick he learned from Speedy Gonzales). Initially, Bugs believed Taz to be a dog and kept him as a house pet named Poochie much to Daffy's discomfort. Eventually, Bugs learned the truth and tried to return him to his home in Tasmania only to find out that Taz would rather live with him. When Taz is not causing trouble for Daffy, Taz has occasionally tried to eat Sylvester. In the episode "Ridiculous Journey," Taz spoke for the first time in the series and had bonded with Sylvester and Tweety while they evaded Blacque Jacques Shellacque.
 Mac (voiced by Rob Paulsen) and Tosh (voiced by Jess Harnell) – are two goofy male gophers who run an antique store. They are shown to hate being away from each other.
 Pete Puma (voiced by John Kassir) – is a dimwitted male puma who is one of Daffy Duck's friends and does various jobs around town.
 Marvin the Martian (voiced by Eric Bauza) – is a male Martian who is one of Daffy Duck's friends.
 Witch Lezah (voiced by Roz Ryan) – is a female witch who lives next door to Bugs Bunny and is often annoyed at the antics of Daffy Duck. Witch Lezah is also a hypnotherapist by trade. The character is very similarly based on Witch Hazel, with 'Lezah' being 'Hazel' spelled backwards.
 Gossamer (voiced by Kwesi Boakye) – is a large orange furry male monster who is Witch Lezah's son. In stark contrast to previous characterizations, Gossamer is portrayed as a timid and kind-hearted young boy with a voice to match.
 Emma "Granny" Webster (voiced by June Foray as an adult, Stephanie Courtney as young Granny) – is a practical and old fashioned 90-year-old lady who is one of Bugs Bunny's neighbors. Granny is revealed to have been a spy for the Allies in World War II. In "The Grand Old Duck of York," it is revealed that Granny also teaches piano lessons. This series marked the final time Foray provided the voice of Granny before her death in 2017.
 Sylvester (voiced by Jeff Bergman) – is Granny's male Tuxedo cat who is always trying to devour Tweety, but always fails when Granny catches him and spanks him hard enough to spit Tweety out. 
 Tweety (voiced by Jeff Bergman) – is Granny's cute male Yellow canary who is frequently targeted by Sylvester. Tweety is revealed to have also been a spy for the Allies in World War II during Granny's youth.
 Foghorn Leghorn (voiced by Jeff Bergman) – is a rich, gullible male rooster who has worked under various jobs.  Foghorn and Daffy get on very well, and are often involved in various schemes. He is a successful entrepreneur who never gets angry with Daffy and forgives him immediately, as he considers Daffy a son to him. 
 Pepé Le Pew (voiced by René Auberjonois in season one, Jeff Bergman in season two) – is a French male skunk who's the local Casanova. In the episode "Members Only" Pepé works as a wedding planner when Pepé planned Bugs and Lola's wedding at the country club.
 Elmer Fudd (voiced by Billy West) – is the resident male newsman. His role here isn't as prominent as it was in the Looney Tunes shorts of yesteryear, as he only makes occasional cameo appearances from time to time. 
 Wile E. Coyote and the Road Runner (Road Runner is voiced by Paul Julian via archive recordings, Wile E. is mute) – is a male coyote and a male roadrunner who are shown in short computer-animated segments in season one. They also make small cameos throughout the show, most notably in "Here Comes the Pig", when Bugs is lost in the desert, he witnesses one of Road Runner and Wile E.'s chases, then asks Wile E. for directions to the highway once he fails. Bugs then decides to use Wile E.'s catapult to get back.

Others
 Dr. Weisberg (voiced by Garry Marshall)  – is a male physician who Bugs and the other characters often visit. His appearance resembles that of Dr. I.Q. Hi from Duck Dodgers.
 Walter Bunny (voiced by John O'Hurley) – Lola Bunny's father who idolizes Bugs. He then appears when they play in the father son tennis tournament. Like most of the characters, he dislikes Daffy.
 Patricia Bunny (voiced by Grey DeLisle in season one, Wendi McLendon-Covey in season two) – is Lola Bunny's mother.
 Carol (voiced by Grey DeLisle) – is a beautiful blonde woman who is Foghorn Leghorn's assistant and limo chauffeur who tries to bring reason to Foghorn Leghorn, especially in regards to his respect and loyalty to Daffy whom she see as trouble and despises.
 Henery Hawk (voiced by Ben Falcone) – is a male chickenhawk that likes to target chickens.
 Cecil Turtle (voiced by Jim Rash) – is an antagonistic male turtle who formerly worked as a customer service representative at the Trans-Visitron cable company until he got fired by Daffy. Cecil became a con artist but ended up getting defeated by Bugs and Porky.
 Frank Russo (voiced by Dennis Farina) – is Tina Russo's dad.
 Slowpoke Rodriguez (voiced by Hugh Davidson) – is Speedy's cousin who is the male Sheriff of Tacapulco, Mexico.
 Hugo the Abominable Snowman (voiced by John DiMaggio) – is a male Yeti that lives in Alaska.
 Blacque Jacque Shellacque (voiced by Maurice LaMarche) – is a male tracker who is the Canadian cousin of Yosemite Sam.
 The Three Bears (voiced by Maurice LaMarche, Grey DeLisle, and John DiMaggio) – is a family of bears consisting of Henry Bear (a short, cruel, dyspeptic father bear), Mama Bear (a deadpan mother bear), and Junior Bear (a huge, good-natured, oafish 7-year-old "child" bear).
 Beaky Buzzard (voiced by Jim Cummings) – is a male buzzard that rescues anyone in the desert in a hot-air balloon.
 Petunia Pig (voiced by Katy Mixon) – A pink female pig that Porky develops a relationship with starting in "Here Comes the Pig".
 Rodney Rabbit (voiced by Chuck Deezy) – is a male rabbit who is Bugs Bunny's old childhood best friend since summer camp.

Production
The Looney Tunes Show was originally envisioned as Looney Tunes Laff Riot, a "true-to-the-classics" show emulating the original run of Looney Tunes shorts announced in July 2009 by Warner Bros. Animation. However, it was scrapped because the executives were not impressed, and it was later retooled into the sitcom-inspired The Looney Tunes Show which premiered on May 3, 2011, on Cartoon Network.
The show features new character designs by Ottawa-based artist Jessica Borutski which were first created for Looney Tunes Laff Riot and also later retooled for the final series. The Laff Riot pilot would surface on September 4, 2020.

As is standard for most modern animated sitcoms like The Simpsons and Family Guy, the series does not use a laugh track.

The animation was produced by Yearim and Rough Draft Korea, along with Toon City Animation in the first season. The Wile E. Coyote and Road Runner CGI shorts were produced by Crew972.

Cancelation and spin-off film
On July 29, 2014, it was announced that the series would not be renewed for a third season. A direct-to-video spin-off film named Looney Tunes: Rabbits Run was released on August 4, 2015.

Broadcast
The Looney Tunes Show premiered in the United States on May 3, 2011, through August 31, 2014, on Cartoon Network. In Australia, the series began airing on 9Go! and Cartoon Network Australia.

The Looney Tunes Show premiered in Africa on Boomerang Africa on May 17, 2011, in France on Boomerang France, in the UK on Boomerang UK and on different Boomerang feeds throughout Europe.

The Looney Tunes Show premiered in Canada on Teletoon on September 5, 2011.

Home media
The Looney Tunes Show has received home video releases for Season 1. The season 2 episode "Super Rabbit" was released as part of the Looney Tunes: Parodies Collection on February 4, 2020.

The first episode was also released on Looney Tunes: Rabbits Run as a special feature.

Reception

Critical response
Critical reception to The Looney Tunes Show was mixed. The voice acting, humor, portrayal of the characters and style received praise, but the show was also criticized for its direction and lack of slapstick, as well as the designs and personality changes of the characters.

In a 2010 interview with CBC News, series animator Jessica Borutski said in response to fan criticism of the series' new character designs, that the original designs were intended for adults and that "[it is] time for a new generation to meet the characters." Borutski said, "a fresh, new design is the only way to keep characters alive." Cartoon historian Chris Robinson noted also that the mark the original characters have on fans is indelible and that fans are not receptive to change. "[Fans] just really become attached to these things," Robinson said. "It's just so strongly rooted in their childhood that they're unable to separate themselves."

Awards and nominations
The Looney Tunes Show was nominated for three Primetime Emmy Awards.

Music
Two albums compiling songs from the show have been released digitally by WaterTower Music:
 Songs from The Looney Tunes Show, Season One (2012)
 Songs from The Looney Tunes Show, Season Two (2013)

Notes

References

External links

 The Looney Tunes Show at Cartoon Network
 Looney Tunes at WarnerBros.com
 
 
 The Looney Tunes Show: More Character Designs Revealed – /Film
 The Totally Odd Couple Animation Magazine
 Review: "The Looney Tunes Show" Variety

2010s American animated television series
2010s American sitcoms
2011 American television series debuts
2014 American television series endings
American animated sitcoms
American animated television spin-offs
American children's animated comedy television series
American children's animated musical television series
American children's television sitcoms
Animated television series reboots
Cartoon Network original programming
English-language television shows
Looney Tunes television series
Television series by Warner Bros. Animation
Television series created by Sam Register
Television shows set in Los Angeles